Juncus sarophorus, the broom rush or fan-flowered rush, is a species of flowering plant in the family Juncaceae. Native to southeastern Australia, and all of New Zealand except the Kermadec Islands, it also has been introduced to Great Britain.

References

sarophorus
Flora of South Australia
Flora of New South Wales
Flora of Victoria (Australia)
Flora of Tasmania
Flora of the North Island
Flora of the South Island
Flora of the Antipodes Islands
Flora of the Chatham Islands
Plants described in 1963